Daniel Knight Udy (21 May 1874 – 29 July 1935) was a New Zealand rugby union player. A hooker, Udy represented Wairarapa at a provincial level, and was a member of the New Zealand national side, the All Blacks, from 1901 to 1903. He played nine matches for the All Blacks including one international.

A cousin Hart Udy represented New Zealand in 1884.

References

1874 births
1935 deaths
New Zealand rugby union players
New Zealand international rugby union players
People from Greytown, New Zealand
Rugby union hookers
Rugby union players from the Wellington Region